Kostiantyn Valeriyovych Trukhanov (Alyoshkin) (born 3 January 1976) is a Ukrainian professional football referee and former footballer.

Sometimes in the 2000s he changed his surname from Alyoshkin to Trukhanov.

References

External links
 
 
 Kostiantyn Trukhanov (Alyoshkin). Footpass at the Football Federation of Ukraine
 Kostiantyn Trukhanov. Footpass at the Football Federation of Ukraine
 Mazan, A. Five years ago the referee Kostiantyn Trukhanov participated in his first game in the Ukrainian Premier League (ПЯТЬ ЛЕТ НАЗАД АРБИТР КОНСТАНТИН ТРУХАНОВ ПРОВЕЛ СВОЙ ПЕРВЫЙ МАТЧ В УКРАИНСКОЙ ПРЕМЬЕР-ЛИГА). Lisichanskiy Nablyudatel (from Sportivnyi Donbass). 3 March 2017

1976 births
Living people
Footballers from Kharkiv
Sportspeople from Kharkiv
Ukrainian football referees
Ukrainian footballers
FC Khartsyzk players
FC Hirnyk Rovenky players
FC Arsenal Kharkiv players
FC Desna Chernihiv players
FC Sokil Zolochiv players
FC Helios Kharkiv players
FC Hazovyk-KhGV Kharkiv players
FC Zhytychi Zhytomyr players
FC Monolit Kostiantynivka players
Association football forwards